Yauheni Seniushkin (born 18 April 1977, in Mazyr) is a Belarusian former road cyclist. Professional from 2000 to 2003, he notably won the Trofeo Matteotti in 2000 and the Belarusian National Road Race Championships in 1999. He also rode in the 2000 and 2002 Giro d'Italia and the 2001 Vuelta a España.

Major results

1997
 3rd Time trial, National Road Championships
1998
 1st Florence-Empoli
1999
 1st  Road race, National Road Championships
 1st Giro del Canavese
 1st Stage 1 Giro della Toscana Under-23
2000
 1st Trofeo Matteotti
2001
 2nd Giro del Lago Maggiore

References

1977 births
Living people
Belarusian male cyclists
People from Mazyr
Sportspeople from Gomel Region